is a Quasi-National Park on Iki Island and Tsushima Island, Nagasaki Prefecture, Japan.

See also

 List of national parks of Japan

References

National parks of Japan
Parks and gardens in Nagasaki Prefecture
Protected areas established in 1968